Bench (stylized as bench/ or BENCH/) is the Philippines’ leading clothing and lifestyle brand. Its story dates back to 1987, when founder and chief innovator Ben Chan got the opportunity to design and sell men’s T-shirts and jeans at a local department store. Thirty years later, with shops in San Francisco, Saudi Arabia, Dubai, Bahrain, Myanmar, Japan, and various cities in China, Bench is now providing affordable and quality products not only to Filipinos, but also to fashion lovers from different corners of the world.

Brand Ambassadors 
Bench was established in 1987, opening as a small store selling men's T-shirts in an outlet of the Department Store (now The SM Store and later as SM Store). In 1991, Bench released its first television commercial featuring Filipino actor Richard Gomez as its endorser which set a standard on how the brand is promoted by its celebrity endorsers.

The proudly Filipino brand has also become known for enlisting some of the world’s most recognized celebrities as its brand ambassadors. This impressive list includes musicians Bruno Mars, Joe Jonas, and Adam Levine, as well as Korean superstars Park Shin Hye and Lee Min Ho. In the 2017, in time for the brand’s 30th anniversary, Bench added Brooklyn Beckham and Cole Sprouse as part of the growing list of their Global ambassadors.  Most recently, the list of Bench's international endorsers included K-Drama idols Hyun Bin, Ji Chang Wook, Kim Soo Hyun, Kim Seon Ho, Ahn Hyo Seop and Wi Ha Jun.  The list grows larger with the inclusion of K-Pop Groups like Twice, Stray Kids and Itzy.

However, Bench has not forgotten its Filipino roots.  The company has always been bannered by local Filipino endorsers (past and present) in the likes of DingDong Dantes, Marian Rivera, Piolo Pascual, Kathryn Bernardo, Daniel Padilla, Coco Martin, Richard Guttierez, Lovi Poe, Maine Mendoza and Francine Diaz to name a few.

Brands 
The company has since grown to include a ladies' line, underwear, fragrances, housewares, snacks and other lifestyle products. Bench has expanded to overseas territories, including the United States, Middle East, China, Myanmar, and Singapore.

In its efforts to further serve the needs of its customers, Bench has expended its fashion line to include sub-brands that cater to specific needs.  This led the company to expand through sub-brands like Bench Body for underwear and intimate apparel, Bench Active for athleisure and active wear, Bench Beauty for cosmetics, Bench Skin Expert - its aesthetic clinic, Bench Fix Salon and Bench Barbers for salon and grooming services and Bench Cafe - its restaurant.

The Future 
Whether it’s creating buzz with the release of a highly anticipated campaign, continually creating products that excite its market, or spearheading initiatives that elevate Filipino talent and craftsmanship to the global stage, Bench continues to raise the benchmark for the Philippines retail landscape. Committed to expanding horizons and pushing boundaries, Bench has never been limited to simple product manufacturing and brand marketing. Instead, the brand remains committed to forming, maintaining, and developing a global lifestyle that is proudly local in its origins.

References

External links
 

Clothing brands
Clothing brands of the Philippines
1987 establishments in the Philippines